The Albuquerque Isotopes are a Minor League Baseball team of the Pacific Coast League and the Triple-A affiliate of the Colorado Rockies.

In 2003, the Calgary Cannons moved from Alberta to Albuquerque and became the Isotopes playing in the Pacific Coast League. The team was affiliated with the Florida Marlins until 2008 and the Dodgers from 2009 to 2014. In conjunction with Major League Baseball's restructuring of Minor League Baseball in 2021, the Isotopes were organized into the Triple-A West, which was renamed the Pacific Coast League in 2022. The team won division titles in 2003, 2009, and 2012; it has never won a league championship.

The Isotopes' mascot is Orbit, a yellow, orange, and red alien. In 2016, Forbes listed the team as the 14th-most valuable Minor League Baseball team with a value of $34 million.

Name origins
The team's name recalls the fictional 'Springfield Isotopes' from the long-running TV series The Simpsons, first appearing in the Season 2 episode "Dancin' Homer" (aired in 1990) in which the main character Homer Simpson temporarily becomes his local baseball team's mascot. In the episode "Hungry, Hungry Homer", which first aired on March 4, 2001, Homer attempts to thwart the team's plan to move to Albuquerque by going on a hunger strike. Subsequently, when the Albuquerque Tribune asked its online readers to help choose a new name for the Cannons, "Isotopes" received 67 percent of the 120,000 votes cast.  "Dancin' Homer" writer Ken Levine said he was surprised when many Albuquerque journalists started calling him regarding the team name, as Isotopes had been chosen as "the funniest, goofiest name we could come up with" and he never thought it had potential for a real team, while adding that he had always liked the city's previous minor league team, the Albuquerque Dukes, as it was the farm team of the Los Angeles Dodgers he supported.

Though team president Ken Young admitted that the name came from the series, he said at the name's unveiling, "We picked it because over the past year it has become a popular name, and it does have something to do with Albuquerque." The "Isotopes" name was deemed appropriate, since New Mexico has a number of well-known scientific and military facilities dealing with nuclear technology, such as Los Alamos National Laboratory, Sandia National Laboratories, and the Waste Isolation Pilot Project (WIPP), as well as the site of the Trinity test. In addition, uranium mining was a significant industry in the state during the Cold War.

In the three months after the team's name was announced in September 2002, before the team ever took the field, the team sold more merchandise than the previous Albuquerque Dukes had sold in any single season, and led minor league baseball in merchandising revenue in 2003. The team said they were able to tell when episodes featuring the Springfield Isotopes would air in different markets based on clusters of orders from different viewing areas. The team has no working agreements with the rightsholders of The Simpsons. However, statues of Homer, Bart, Lisa, and Marge Simpson (originally created as a promotional item for the 2007 film) are located at RGCU Field at Isotopes Park.

History
The Isotopes were preceded in minor league baseball play by the Albuquerque Dukes of the 1915 Rio Grande Association, followed by the Albuquerque Dons and Albuquerque Cardinals, who played as members of the Arizona-Texas League from 1932 to 1941. In 1946, the Albuquerque Dukes began a long era of play as members of the West Texas-New Mexico League.

Albuquerque's previous minor-league team was the Los Angeles Dodgers-affiliated Albuquerque Dukes, which won several PCL championships in the 1970s and 1980s. The team was sold to Marshall Glickman and Mike Higgins, who moved it to Oregon in March 2000 and renamed it the Portland Beavers.  

In January 2001, a group of businessmen led by Ken Young and Mike Koldyke agreed to buy the Calgary Cannons with the intention of bringing the team to Albuquerque for the 2003 season. But Young and Koldyke told the city of Albuquerque that they would only buy the team if the city would fund a new stadium or renovate the existing Albuquerque Sports Stadium. In May 2001, the city approved a vote to spend $25 million on a renovation. Ken Young and Mike Koldyke then bought the Cannons, moved to the team to Albuquerque, and renamed it the Isotopes. 

The planned renovation eventually turned into the construction of a new baseball facility, Isotopes Park, around the old playing field.

The Isotopes played their first official game in Albuquerque on April 11, 2003, three years after the Dukes left for Portland. At Isotopes Park, the baseball team was greeted by over 12,000 fans in their opening day game. In the Isotopes' opening season, the baseball team saw over 575,000 fans enter their stadium to watch their newly acquired team perform. During the 2003 season, Albuquerque saw immediate success as their new team won the 2003 Central Division Title and in addition to that, entered the 2003 Pacific Coast League Playoffs.

In 2008, the Albuquerque Isotopes achieved a new feat when they reached a new franchise record in attendance with over 590,000 fans.  

In July 2009, Albuquerque received an unusual amount of nationwide attention following the arrival of Manny Ramirez. The outfielder at the time was under intense scrutiny for a suspension he received after testing positive for performance-enhancing drugs, more commonly known as PEDs, and was slated to play a total of three games with the Albuquerque Isotopes before returning to the major league. The Albuquerque Isotopes ran multiple promotions for the arrival of Manny Ramirez including advertisements, wigs bearing an extreme similarity to the hair of Manny Ramirez, etc. which ultimately led to a then-attendance record with over 15,000 fans attending the outfielder's opening game with the Isotopes. In addition to this, there was a large amount of harsh criticism towards the team from numerous sports media outlets including ESPN and sports commentators such as Bob Costas.

In conjunction with Major League Baseball's restructuring of Minor League Baseball in 2021, the Isotopes were organized into the Triple-A West. Albuquerque ended the season in fourth place in the Eastern Division with a 52–68 record. No playoffs were held to determine a league champion; instead, the team with the best regular-season record was declared the winner. However, 10 games that had been postponed from the start of the season were reinserted into the schedule as a postseason tournament called the Triple-A Final Stretch in which all 30 Triple-A clubs competed for the highest winning percentage. Albuquerque finished the tournament tied for seventh place with a 6–4 record. In 2022, the Triple-A West became known as the Pacific Coast League, the name historically used by the regional circuit prior to the 2021 reorganization.

Season-by-season records

Roster

Awards

In September 2009, Mitch Jones was named the winner of the Joe Bauman Home Run Award, for the most home runs, 35, in minor league baseball.

In 2014, Joc Pederson, after leading the league in OBP (.435), runs (106), home runs (33), walks (100), and OPS (1.017), and setting Isotopes single-season records for walks and runs scored, was voted the 2014 PCL Most Valuable Player, named to the post-season All-PCL team, and named the PCL Rookie of the Year, which is awarded to a player in his first year at the Triple-A level. He was also selected to Baseball America'''s 2014 Minor League All-Star team.

Notable broadcasters
Mike Roberts, longtime (1966–2013) Albuquerque sports announcer on TV and radio for local news, professional baseball, college football and basketball, and high school sports broadcasts
Bob Socci, 2003–2006
Russ Langer 1996–2000, former Montreal Expos and Baltimore Orioles fill-in broadcaster

Cultural references
In the USA Network series In Plain Sight, the character Raphael Ramirez (Cristián de la Fuente) plays for the Isotopes.
In the AMC series Breaking Bad, which is set in Albuquerque, Walter White can be seen wearing an Isotopes hat.
In the NBC series The Voice, music producer Adam Blackstone wore an Albuquerque Isotopes hat during Season One Battle Rounds preparations.
In the AMC series Better Call Saul, prequel to Breaking Bad'', an Isotopes air freshener hangs in a cab and Mike Ehrmantraut watches an Isotopes game on TV in the opening episode of Season 4.

References

External links

 

 
Sports in Albuquerque, New Mexico
Pacific Coast League teams
Baseball teams established in 2003
Professional baseball teams in New Mexico
Colorado Rockies minor league affiliates
Los Angeles Dodgers minor league affiliates
Miami Marlins minor league affiliates
2003 establishments in New Mexico
Triple-A West teams